Fits and Starts is a 2017 American comedy film written and directed by Laura Terruso and starring Wyatt Cenac, Greta Lee and Maria Dizzia.

Cast
Wyatt Cenac as David
Louis Cancelmi as Daniel 
Greta Lee as Jennifer
Maria Dizzia as Sawyer Edwards
Alex Karpovsky as Charles
Ben Sinclair as Parking Attendant
Larry Murphy as McDannell
Sam Seder as Dressler
Diane Ciesla as Lily Geist
Buzz Bovshow as Bernard Geist
Michael Cyril Creighton as Richard Pringle
Matt Dellapina	as Jordan Roth
Jennifer Prediger as Shopper

Reception
The film has a 63% rating on Rotten Tomatoes.

References

External links
 
 

American comedy films
2010s English-language films
2010s American films